Gideon Rose is a former editor of Foreign Affairs and a member of the Council on Foreign Relations. He served as Associate Director for Near East and South Asian Affairs on the staff of the National Security Council from 1994 to 1995 under the Clinton Administration.

Early life and education
Rose was born to a Jewish family, the son of Joanna (née Semel) and Daniel Rose, a real estate developer. In 1985 he earned a B.A. in Classics from Yale University, where he was a member of Scroll and Key. He received his Ph.D. in government from Harvard University in 1994.

Career
In 1985 Rose was appointed assistant editor of The National Interest, a foreign policy quarterly. He then went on to hold a similar position at a domestic quarterly, The Public Interest. He served as Associate Director for Near East and South Asian Affairs on the staff of the National Security Council from 1994 to 1995 under the Clinton administration.

In 1996, he joined Princeton University's Politics Department as a lecturer on American foreign policy and then held a similar position at the School of International and Public Affairs (SIPA) at Columbia University, where he currently teaches as an adjunct professor in the department of political science.

Rose was an Olin Senior Fellow and the Deputy Director of National Security Studies at the Council on Foreign Relations from 1995 to 2000, before he was appointed managing editor of Foreign Affairs to replace Fareed Zakaria. On June 3, 2010, it was announced that Rose would be succeeding James F. Hoge, Jr. as the editor of Foreign Affairs. He took up the position on October 1, 2010. Rose left as editor in January 2021 and joined the Council on Foreign Relations' thinktank to write a book. He was succeeded by Daniel Kurtz-Phelan.

Works 
A New U.S. Policy Toward India and Pakistan (1997), with Richard N. Haass
How Did This Happen?: Terrorism and the New War (2001), edited with James F. Hoge, Jr.
The Rise of China (2002), edited with James F. Hoge, Jr.
The War on Terror (2002), edited with James F. Hoge, Jr. 
The Middle East in Crisis (2002), edited with James F. Hoge, Jr. 
America and the World: Debating the New Shape of International Politics (2003), edited with James F. Hoge, Jr.
Understanding the War on Terror (2005), with James F. Hoge, Jr.
How Wars End: Why We Always Fight the Last Battle (2010)
Among Nations: Readings in International Relations (2010), editor
The New Arab Revolt: What Happened, What It Means, and What Comes Next
The Clash of Ideas: The Ideological Battles that Made the Modern World - And Will Shape the Future (2011), with Jonathan Tepperman
The U.S. vs. Al Qaeda: A History of the War on Terror (2011), edited with Jonathan Tepperman
"Making Modernity Work; The Reconciliation of Capitalism and Democracy", Foreign Affairs (January/February 2012)

See also
Capitalism
Council on Foreign Relations
Democracy
 Foreign Affairs
 James Hoge

References
Notes

External links
  Video and audio of Gideon Rose speaking at Middlebury College on April 30, 2007
 

Living people
Horace Mann School alumni
Yale University alumni
Harvard University alumni
Princeton University faculty
Columbia University faculty
20th-century American Jews
American magazine editors
Rose family
1964 births
21st-century American Jews